Franco Latini (September 12, 1927 – February 2, 1991) was an Italian actor and voice actor. He was considered to be one of the top voice dubbers for many animated films and cartoons for audiences across Italy.

Biography
Born in Pomezia, which is in Rome, Latini started out working as a singer in nightclubs in the early 1950s, then he went on to work in the theatre and star in the 1953 film The World Condemns Them. Among Latini's most popular filmography includes the 1966 musical-comedy film Mondo pazzo... gente matta! starring Silvana Pampanini and the 1976 film The Black Maid starring Carla Brait.

Despite Latini's popularity working as an actor, he was also heavily active as a voice actor. He dubbed Stan Laurel in several redubs of Laurel and Hardy shorts and films in which he was paired up with Carlo Croccolo. He also dubbed characters in many animated productions. He was the first voice of Skeletor in Masters of the Universe and from 1983 until 1988, he was the primary Italian voice of Donald Duck and he even dubbed Tom from Tom & Jerry and various characters from Looney Tunes and The Muppet Show.

Latini founded his own dubbing company in the late 1970s, which was active until some point during the 1980s. In 1981, he lost one of his legs in an accident, which rendered him unable to perform on screen. After that, he devoted himself exclusively to dubbing.

Personal life
Latini had three children, daughters Laura and Ilaria from his marriage with dialogue writer Maria Pinto and son Fabrizio from his relationship with actress Piera Vidale. All three followed in Latini's footsteps.

Death
Latini died of a stroke at the Agostino Gemelli University Polyclinic in Rome around the evening of February 2, 1991 at the age of 63. He was later interred at Campo Verano.

Filmography

Cinema
The World Condemns Them (1953) - Double Bass Player (uncredited)
Serenatella sciuè sciuè (1958) - Barone Paolino
The Motorized Women (1963) - Plump Man with a Hat (uncredited)
Bullet in the Flesh (1964) - Bob Rusky
Blue Summer (1965) - Oliveras
Mondo pazzo... gente matta! (1966) - Paolo Pizziconi
For Love... for Magic... (1967) 
Johnny Hamlet (1968) - Gravedigger
May God Forgive You... But I Won't (1968) - Undertaker
Jus primae noctis (1972) 
The Black Maid (1976) - Placido

Television
Qui squadra mobile (1973) - Padrone

Dubbing roles

Animation
Luke in The Rescuers
Various characters in Looney Tunes
Various characters in Merrie Melodies
Daffy Duck in The Bugs Bunny/Road Runner Movie
Various characters in The Looney Looney Looney Bugs Bunny Movie
Various characters in Bugs Bunny's 3rd Movie: 1001 Rabbit Tales
Various characters in Daffy Duck's Fantastic Island
Various characters in The Flintstones
Various characters in Kimba the White Lion
Bobo and Rock Slag in The Man Called Flintstone
Various characters in The Muppet Show
Skeletor in He-Man and the Masters of the Universe (season 1)
Muttley in Wacky Races
Muttley in Dastardly and Muttley in Their Flying Machines
Tom in Tom & Jerry
Donald Duck in All Disney Productions (1983-1988)
Mr. Jinks in Pixie and Dixie and Mr. Jinks
Top Cat in Top Cat
Top Cat in Yogi's Treasure Hunt
Top Cat in Top Cat and the Beverly Hills Cats
Popeye in Popeye and Son
Spider Monster in Scooby-Doo and the Reluctant Werewolf
Hair Bear in Help!... It's the Hair Bear Bunch!
Grape Ape / Beegle Beagle in The Great Grape Ape Show
Gus Holiday / Brutus the Lion in The Roman Holidays
Punkin' Puss in Punkin' Puss & Mushmouse

Live action
Stan Laurel in Laurel and Hardy (1968-1970 redubs)
Moe Gelly in Once Upon a Time in America
Benjy Benjamin in It's a Mad, Mad, Mad, Mad World
El Nebuloso in Yellowbeard
Tushin in War and Peace
Albert C. Provo in The Green Berets
Second Griner in Deliverance
Photographer in Little Fauss and Big Halsy
Eugene in Honky Tonk Freeway
Lucius in The Beauty Jungle

References

External links

 
 
 
 

1927 births
1991 deaths
Male actors from Rome
Italian male film actors
Italian male stage actors
Italian male television actors
Italian male voice actors
Italian voice directors
20th-century Italian male actors
Italian amputees
Burials at Campo Verano